Kornél or Kornel may refer to:

Kornél Ábrányi (1822–1903), Hungarian pianist, music writer, theorist, composer
Kornél Bardóczky (born 1978), retired professional tennis player from Hungary
Kornél Béke (born 1998), Hungarian canoeist
Kornél Csernik (born 1998), Hungarian football player
Kornél Dávid (born 1971), retired Hungarian professional basketball player
Kornel Filipowicz (1913–1990), Polish novelist, poet and screenwriter
Kornél Havasi (1892–1945), Jewish-Hungarian chess master
Kornel Hoffmann (born 1881), Austrian footballer
Kornél Késmárki (1903–1965), Hungarian athlete
Kornél Khiesz (born 1992), Hungarian professional footballer
Karl-Ferdinand Kornel (1882–1953), Estonian jurist, journalist, diplomat and politician
Lukács Kornél (born 1991), Hungarian rally and rallycross driver
Kornél Kulcsár (born 1991), Hungarian football player
Kornel Lanczos (1893–1974), Hungarian mathematician and physicist
Kornel Makuszyński (1884–1953), Polish writer of children's and youth literature
Kornél Marosvári (1943–2016), Hungarian sports shooter
Kornél Molnár (born 1933), Hungarian boxer
Kornel Morawiecki (1941–2019), Polish politician, founder and leader of Fighting Solidarity
Kornél Mundruczó (born 1975), Hungarian film and theatre director
Kornél Nagy (born 1986), Hungarian handball player
Kornel Osyra (born 1993), Polish professional footballer
Kornél Oszlányi (1893–1960), Hungarian military officer, division commander during World War II
Kornél Pajor (1923–2016), Hungarian speed skating World Champion
Kornel Saláta (born 1985), Slovak professional football
Kornél Sámuel (1883–1914), Hungarian sculptor
Kornél Szántó (born 1978), Hungarian short track speed skater
Kornél Szűcs (born 2001), Hungarian football player
Gábor Kornél Tolnai(1902–1982), Hungarian-Swedish engineer, inventor, constructor
Kornel Ujejski (1823–1897), Polish poet, patriot and political writer of the Austrian Empire
Viktorin Kornel of Všehrdy (1460–1520), Czech humanist and lawyer, Vice-scribe at the Land Court in Prague Castle
Kornel Witkowski (born 2002), Polish figure skater

See also
The Wondrous Voyage of Kornel Esti, a 1995 Hungarian drama film
Kernell (disambiguation)
Kornele
Kornelia
Kornelin (disambiguation)
Korneliya
Cornelius (disambiguation)